Sandra R. Galef (born May 7, 1940) is an American politician serving as a state legislator who was a member of the New York State Assembly for 30 years.

Career
Galef represents the 95th Assembly District, spanning Westchester and Putnam counties. The district includes the Westchester towns of Cortlandt, Croton-on-Hudson, Ossining, Peekskill, and the Putnam communities of Philipstown, Cold Spring, and Kent.

Personal life
Prior to her election to the Assembly in 1992, Galef worked as a schoolteacher, a Westchester County Legislator, and President of the New York Association of Counties. She currently chairs the Assembly Committee on Real Property Taxation, and is the former chair of the committee on Libraries and Education Technology.

She is a graduate of Purdue University and holds a M.A. in education from the University of Virginia. She currently resides within her own district in the town of Ossining.

See also
 New York state elections, 2010
 New York State Legislature

References

External links
New York Assembly Member Website
Biography: New York State Democratic Committee

{{s-bef|before=

1940 births
Living people
Democratic Party members of the New York State Assembly
Legislators from Westchester County, New York
Politicians from Westchester County, New York
Women state legislators in New York (state)
Place of birth missing (living people)
People from Yonkers, New York
Purdue University alumni
Curry School of Education alumni
21st-century American politicians
21st-century American women politicians